The Paleo-Arctic Tradition is the name given by archaeologists to the cultural tradition of the earliest well-documented human occupants of the North American Arctic, which date from the period 8000–5000 BC. The tradition covers Alaska and expands far into the east, west, and the Southwest Yukon Territory.

The Upward Sun River site, a Late Pleistocene archaeological site associated with the Paleo-Arctic Tradition, located in the Tanana Valley, Alaska has now been dated to around 11,500 BP. Upward Sun River is the site of the oldest human remains discovered on the American side of Beringia.

Around 8000 BC, Alaska was still connected to Siberia with the landbridge, located in the current Bering Strait. People who inhabited this region in Alaska were of the Dyuktai tradition, originally located in Siberia. Eventually, the Dyuktai changed into the Sumnagin culture, a hunting/fishing group, whose culture was defined by possessing a new technology. Other cultures flourished as well, all being placed under the general category of the Paleo-Arctic tradition.

"The Paleo-Arctic tradition is still a shadowy entity, a patchwork of local Early Holocene cultural traditions that flourished over an enormous area of extreme northwestern North America for at least 4000 years, and longer in many places. Other terms such as the Northwest Microblade tradition, Denali Complex, and Beringian tradition have been used to describe these same general adaptations, but Paleo-Arctic is the most appropriate because it is the kind of general label that reflects a great variety of different human adaptations during a period of increasing environmental diversity and change" (Fagan, p.173).

The Paleo-Arctic is mostly known for lithic remains (stone technology). Some artifacts found include microblades, small wedge-shaped cores, some leaf-shaped bifaces, scrapers, and graving tools. The microblades were used as hunting weapons and were mounted in wood, antler, or bone points.  Paleo-Arctic stone specialists also created bifaces that were used as tools and as cores for the production of large artifact blanks.  Little evidence remains of the culture's settlement patterns, because many of the settlements were inundated by the rising sea levels of the Holocene; however, remains of stone tools were discovered, giving indirect evidence of settlement sites.

Nenana Complex 
The Nenana Complex is the oldest part of the Paleo-Arctic Tradition found in cultural  stratigraphic layers dating from 11,800 to 11,000  BP. It has been found at the Dry Creek, Moose Creek, and Walker Road archaeological sites and is characterized by bifacially flaked, unfluted spear points. The complex also includes bifacially worked knives and unifacially retouched lithic flakes lacking microblades that generally resemble similar lithics found in sites of the Kamchatka Peninsula in Russia, possibly due to migration and cultural exchange over the  Bering land bridge.

Denali Complex 
The Denali Complex denotes a more recent part of the Paleo-Arctic Tradition dated to 10,000 BP. Although it is found in similar sites to the Nenana Complex such as the Dry Creek archaeological site, it is distinguished stratigraphically and through the presence of microblades, wedge-shaped lithic cores, and  burins.

See also
Paleo-Indians
Archaeology of the Americas
List of archaeological periods (North America)
Upward Sun River site

References

 Fagan, Brian M. Ancient North America. London: Thames & Hudson Ltd., 2005.

Paleo-Arctic Tradition
Archaic period in North America
Archaeology of the United States
Archaeology of Canada
Native American history of Alaska
Prehistory of the Arctic
Pre-Columbian cultures
Stone Age